Whistling in the Dark (U.S. television title: Scared!) is a 1933 American pre-Code comedy-mystery film directed by Elliott Nugent and starring Ernest Truex and Una Merkel. The plot concerns a mystery writer whose scheme for a perfect murder comes to the attention of a gangster (Edward Arnold), who plans to use it.

The film is based on the Broadway play of the same name by Laurence Gross and Edward Childs Carpenter, which played for 265 performances in 1932-33. Edward Arnold played the same role in the Broadway stage production.

In 1941, the film was remade starring Red Skelton and Ann Rutherford. Skelton then played the role of "Wallace Porter" in two sequels.

Plot
Otto Barfuss refuses to pay for protection and won't bow down to the syndicate. When they come for him, he puts the sting on them. Jake Dillon thinks its time to end Barfuss for good, but he knows it has to be done properly so that they don't get caught.

Wallace Porter and his girl Toby Van Buren are eloping when their car breaks down near Dillon's house. He's a mystery writer who brags about his abilities to write the perfect murder. He is forced to give Dillon the perfect way to kill Barfuss while he and Toby are held as prisoners.

Porter manages to connect the radio to contact the phone operator. He and Toby get a message out to save Barfuss. Dillon comes back and is caught by the police.

Cast
 Ernest Truex as Wallace Porter
 Una Merkel as Toby Van Buren
 Edward Arnold as Jake Dillon
 John Miljan as Charlie Shaw
 C. Henry Gordon as Ricco Lombardo
 Johnny Hines as Slim Scanlon
 Joseph Cawthorn as Otto Barfuss
 Nat Pendleton as Joe Salvatore
 Tenen Holtz as Herman Lefkowitz

References
Notes

External links
 
 
 
 

1933 films
American comedy mystery films
American crime comedy films
American black-and-white films
American films based on plays
Films directed by Elliott Nugent
Films directed by Charles Reisner
Metro-Goldwyn-Mayer films
1930s crime comedy films
1930s comedy mystery films
1933 comedy films
1930s American films